FC Irtysh is the name of following football clubs:  (named after Irtysh river, which flows in Kazakhstan, Russia and China)
Irtysh Pavlodar, a Kazakh football club, playing in the Kazakhstan Premier League
Irtysh Omsk, a Russian football club, playing in the Russian Second Division